The battle of Al Masini valley, code named Operation Al Faisal by the coalition, was an operation to clear the Al-Qaeda controlled stronghold of Al Misini valley in Hadramut province.

Background

Battle 
On February 17, 2018 Hadrami Elite Forces, backed by heavy UAE aerial support, launched Operation Al-Faisal, an offensive to retake Al-Masini Valley from AQAP militants. The offensive began when Hadrami Elite Forces launched a preemptive attack from three directions, that laid siege to all AQAP militants in the valley. On February 18 Hadrami Elite Forces had entered the valley and begun to slowly retake all areas in and around the valley. After fierce fighting for 48 hours, AQAP militants retreated from the valley and Hadramai forces gained full control over an operation room that was run by AQAP militants in the valley and confiscated the equipment and ammunition used by the terror group in carrying out its criminal operations. The governor of Hadhramaut, Major General Faraj al-Bahsani declared that the operation was a success and that others like it, will follow until the region was fully rid of AQAP. Furthermore, while combing the area, large caches of ammunition, including mortar guns and missiles were found and the Yemeni forces secured the entire zone by staging military posts and patrol units across the surrounding plateaus to preempt any counter offensives by the AQAP militants.

Aftermath 
After AQAP retreated, Hadrami Elite chased them for several kilometers before ceasing pursuit and establishing positions and checkpoints.

References 

Al Masini
Al Masini
2018 in Yemen
Yemeni Crisis (2011–present)
Yemeni Civil War (2014–present)
Hadhramaut Governorate